Lauren Lenentine (born June 24, 2000) is a Canadian curler originally from Cornwall, Prince Edward Island and currently from Winnipeg, Manitoba. She is currently the alternate on Team Jennifer Jones.

Career
Lenentine curled out of her home province of Prince Edward Island for most of her junior career before moving to Nova Scotia for the 2018–19 season to join the Kaitlyn Jones rink, replacing Kristin Clarke who aged out of juniors and had joined Mary-Anne Arsenault's rink. The team was invited to play in the 2018 Masters Grand Slam of Curling event as the sponsors exemption. Despite this, they finished the round robin with a 3–1 record, beating Rachel Homan, Kerri Einarson and Silvana Tirinzoni with their only loss coming to Tracy Fleury. They couldn't continue their momentum into the playoffs however, falling to Chelsea Carey in the quarterfinals. They lost the semifinal of the 2019 Canadian Junior Curling Championships to BC's Sarah Daniels. The following season, she and teammate Karlee Burgess moved to Manitoba to join the Zacharias siblings Mackenzie and Emily to try to return to the World Juniors. When the team won the Manitoba Junior Provincials, it made Lenentine the first female junior curler to represent three provinces at the Canadian Junior Curling Championships. The team went on to win the 2020 Canadian Junior Curling Championships and later the 2020 World Junior Curling Championships.

Due to the COVID-19 pandemic in Canada, many provinces had to cancel their provincial championships, with member associations selecting their representatives for the 2021 Scotties Tournament of Hearts. Due to this situation, Curling Canada added three Wild Card teams to the national championship, which were based on the CTRS standings from the 2019–20 season. Because Team Zacharias ranked 11th on the CTRS and kept at least three of their four players together for the 2020–21 season, they got the second Wild Card spot at the 2021 Scotties in Calgary, Alberta. At the Hearts, they finished with a 3–5 round robin record, failing to qualify for the championship round.

Team Zacharias won their second event of the 2021–22 season, going undefeated to capture the Mother Club Fall Curling Classic. They later had a semifinal finish at the Stu Sells Toronto Tankard after losing to eventual winners Team Hollie Duncan. Because of their successes on tour, Team Zacharias had enough points to qualify for the 2021 Canadian Olympic Curling Pre-Trials. At the Pre-Trials, the team finished the round robin with a 4–2 record. This qualified them for the double knockout round, where they lost both of their games and were eliminated. Elsewhere on tour, the team reached the quarterfinals of the Red Deer Curling Classic and won the MCT Championships in November 2021. At the 2022 Manitoba Scotties Tournament of Hearts in December 2021, Team Zacharias finished with a 3–2 record in their pool, enough to advance to the championship pool. They then won three straight games to finish first overall and earn a bye to the provincial final. In the final, they faced the Kristy Watling rink which they defeated 7–5, earning the right to represent Manitoba at the 2022 Scotties Tournament of Hearts. At the Hearts, the team finished the round robin with a 5–3 record. This qualified them for a tiebreaker against the Northwest Territories' Kerry Galusha, which they lost 8–6 and were eliminated. Team Zacharias played in their first Grand Slam event at the 2022 Players' Championship. There, they posted a 2–3 record, missing the playoffs. They wrapped up their season at the 2022 Best of the West event where they lost in the semifinals to Corryn Brown.

On March 17, 2022, Team Zacharias announced that they would be joining forces with Jennifer Jones for the 2022–23 season. Jones would take over the team as skip, with the four Zacharias members each moving down one position in the lineup.

Personal life
Lenentine is currently a student at the University of Manitoba.

Teams

References

External links

Living people
2000 births
Canadian women curlers
Curlers from Prince Edward Island
Curlers from Nova Scotia
People from Queens County, Prince Edward Island
Sportspeople from Charlottetown
Curlers from Winnipeg
University of Manitoba alumni